is a spin-off title of the Suikoden franchise by Konami which includes both a Game Boy Advance game and a physical collectible card game. Both were released in the fall of 2001 in Japan.

Unlike other areas of the Suikoden franchise, in which the storyline is a major
element of gameplay, Card Stories focuses mainly on the card battles themselves
and less on the plot.

Most of the cards feature characters who appear in both Suikoden and Suikoden II of Konami's role-playing video game series.
Several cards also feature characters who would later go on to appear in Suikoden III.

The GBA game retells the story of Suikoden II with a few changes.

References

2001 video games
Card games introduced in 2011
Digital collectible card games
Game Boy Advance games
Game Boy Advance-only games
Japan-exclusive video games
Suikoden
Video games developed in Japan
Single-player video games